Loved is the eighth studio album by Claire Kuo. It was released on 22 December 2016 by Linfair Records.

Track listing
"Loved" / 我们曾相爱
"Don't Make Me Cry" / 别惹哭我
"No Matter What" / 傻傻爱着你
"I Am Moving On" / 该忘的日子
"Take A Breath" / 深呼吸
"Breaking Up For Now" / 分手看看
"Leave Me Hanging" / 消耗寂寞
"After the Love Has Gone" / 分开不是谁不好
"Partners" / 拍档
"You Were Meant For Me" / 最美的等候
"How to Forget" / 忘了如何遗忘
"I Love Me" / 遇见新的我

MV
I Am Moving On / 该忘的日子
Breaking Up For Now / 分手看看
After the Love Has Gone / 分开不是谁不好
Partners / 拍档
How to Forget / 忘了如何遗忘
I Love Me / 遇见新的我

References

Claire Kuo albums
2016 albums